Anthony Lovrich (born 5 December 1961 in Perth, Western Australia) is an Australian rower. He competed in the 1984 Los Angeles Olympic Games, earning a silver medal in the men's Quadruple Scull, before beginning his coaching career. In 1996 he was coach for the Australian Olympic rowing team, and now coaches at Guildford Grammar School in Perth, Western Australia.

References 
 
 

1961 births
Living people
Australian male rowers
Rowers from Perth, Western Australia
Rowers at the 1984 Summer Olympics
Olympic silver medalists for Australia
Olympic medalists in rowing
Medalists at the 1984 Summer Olympics
20th-century Australian people